Chris Knight (born 1942) is a British anthropologist.

Life

Professional 

Following an MPhil in Russian Literature from the University of Sussex in 1975, Knight gained his PhD in 1987 at the University of London for a thesis on Claude Lévi-Strauss's four-volume Mythologiques. He became a lecturer in anthropology at the University of East London in 1989 and a professor at the same institution in 2000. A founding member of the "Radical Anthropology Group" (RAG), Knight is currently a senior research fellow in the Department of Anthropology, University College London.

Since graduating from the University of Sussex in 1966, Knight has been exploring the idea that language and symbolic culture emerged in the human species through a process of Darwinian evolution culminating at a certain point in revolutionary change. Becoming human was, from this perspective, a classic instance of a dialectical process, i.e. one in which quantitative change culminates eventually in a qualitative leap. In pursuing this line of thought, Knight takes inspiration not only from modern Darwinian theorists such as Eörs Szathmáry and John Maynard Smith but also from Karl Marx and Friedrich Engels, who in their later years were fascinated by what was then the new science of anthropology.

In 1996, Knight co-founded the EVOLANG series of international conferences on the origins of language, since when he has become a prominent figure in debates on the origins of human symbolic culture and especially the origin of language. In recognition of his contribution to evolutionary linguistics, Knight was awarded the Evolutionary Linguistics Association's Lifetime Achievement Award at an event held in Vienna in April 2014.

Selected works

Blood Relations: Menstruation and the Origins of Culture 

Published in 1991, Knight's first full-length book, Blood Relations: Menstruation and the origins of culture was favourably reviewed in The Times Higher Educational Supplement, The Times Literary Supplement and The London Review of Books; it also received publicity through an interview on the BBC World Service Science Now programme, a debate with Dr. Henrietta Moore on BBC Radio 4 Woman’s Hour, a front-page news report in The Independent on Sunday and Daily Telegraph and coverage in many other periodicals. The Journal of the Royal Anthropological Institute described Blood Relations as 'a very readable, witty, lively treasure-trove of anthropological wisdom and insight.' In April 1998, the Independent on Sunday featured a two-page article on Knight's work by science correspondent Marek Kohn, who described Knight's approach to the origins of language as 'drawing together some of the most dynamic lines of argument in current British evolutionary thought'.

In 1997, the feminist journalist and historian Barbara Ehrenreich did much to explain and utilize Knight's ideas in her book, Blood Rites: The origins and history of the passions of war. Among major poets, Ted Hughes and Peter Redgrove favourably cite Knight's insights concerning menstrual synchrony and its place in world mythology and folklore.

The sculptor Anish Kapoor draws inspiration from Knight's work, describing how his appreciation of the colour red – in, for example, Kapoor's celebrated sculpture Blood Relations – owes much to Knight's 'wonderful theory' that the world's first art was produced when women began decorating themselves with red ochre cosmetics.

Another prominent figure inspired by Knight's book is the Chilean revolutionary activist and artist Cecilia Vicuña. Having studied Knight's work over many years, she associates the blood-red woolen quipus or 'Red Threads' central to much of her recent work with the string figures and images of menstruating goddesses in Aboriginal Australian rock-art as described and interpreted by Knight in his book.

Although Knight's theory of human cultural and symbolic origins remains controversial, in the years since Blood Relations was published it has become central to an increasing body of archaeological research and debate on how symbolic culture first emerged during the evolution of our species.

Decoding Chomsky: Science and Revolutionary Politics 

Knight's more recent book, Decoding Chomsky is a sustained exploration of Noam Chomsky's approach to science and its relationship to politics. Its publication in October 2016 sparked instant public controversy. A reviewer for the US The Chronicle of Higher Education hailed it as perhaps 'the most in-depth meditation on "the Chomsky problem" ever published', recommending it as 'a compelling read'. In Britain, The New Scientist described Knight's controversial account as 'trenchant and compelling.' Chomsky responded dismissively to Knight's book in both The New York Times and The London Review of Books.

Other books 
 (ed. with R. Dunbar and C. Power) The Evolution of Culture. Edinburgh: Edinburgh University Press, 1999. .
 (ed. with J. R. Hurford and M. Studdert-Kennedy) Approaches to the Evolution of Language: Social and cognitive bases. Cambridge: Cambridge University Press, 1998. 
 (ed. with M. Studdert-Kennedy and J. R. Hurford) The Evolutionary Emergence of Language. Cambridge: Cambridge University Press, 2000. .
 (ed. with R. Botha) The Prehistory of Language. Oxford: Oxford University Press, 2009. .
 (ed. with R. Botha) The Cradle of Language. Oxford: Oxford University Press, 2009. 
 (ed. with D. Dor and J. Lewis) The Social Origins of Language. Oxford: Oxford University Press, 2014.

Activism 

Initially a supporter of the Militant tendency in the Labour Party, Chris Knight was later a founder editor of the journal Labour Briefing (he remains on the board) and has a long record of political activism. Although sometimes described as an anarchist, Knight defines himself intellectually as working within the tradition of Marxism.

During the 1984-1985 miners' strike, Knight was involved in setting up a group called Pit Dragon with the aim of bringing together writers and artists in support of the miners. Roland Muldoon of the CAST theatre company played a significant role in the organization's success, as did the children's writer Michael Rosen. According to the New Musical Express, writing at the time: 'Pit Dragon has managed to harness the talents of every worthwhile artist on the seamier side of the London cabaret circuit and the potential to develop into the most dynamic political/cultural organization since Rock Against Racism.' In February 1985, the group planned an unusual way of turning a mass picket into a lively cultural occasion. Knight had the idea of inviting fire-eaters, tightrope walkers, poets, comedians, jugglers and musicians to meet at the gates of Neasden Power Station in Brent, North London. The police were warned in advance, the artists staged their performances on the picket line and not one truck even attempted to get through. The picket was counted a success when the power station was shut down for the entire day.

Reminiscent of the carnivalesque atmosphere outside the Neasden Power Station was the mass picket held in Liverpool to celebrate the first anniversary of the Liverpool dockers' strike and lock-out which had begun late in 1995. Linking up with activists in the anti-car movement Reclaim the Streets, Knight used his position in the London Support Group to introduce the dockers to these 'Kill the Car' environmentalists. Realizing they had much in common, the two culturally different groups spent the summer of 1996 working on an ambitious plan. On 28 September, a 10,000 strong celebratory cultural event and street party was held on the quayside, followed at break of dawn next morning by a mass picket and symbolic roof-top occupation of what the dockers termed 'the rat house' – the Mersey Docks and Harbour Company headquarters and nearby gantries.

For twelve months, Britain's mainstream media outlets had effectively ignored the long-running dispute. But the dockers' alliance with musicians and environmentalists now drew global attention to their cause, giving them new courage and inspiring them to continue their strike into its second year. The dispute now gathered momentum in such a way that by late January 1997, trade unionists in over a hundred ports and cities across the world had linked up with environmentalists and others in making the action global. In the end, the dockers' picket line proved to be not only global in reach but a record-breaker in lasting for more than two years.

Since the early decades of the twentieth century, industrial militancy by dockers had been uniquely internationalist for reasons intrinsic to their particular trade. Once a tanker has been forced by pickets to unload elsewhere, other ports get drawn into the dispute. And so it was that in the months building up to the 'Battle of Seattle', the slogan invented for their own reasons by Liverpool's militant dockers – 'Another World Is Possible' – began hitting the headlines across the world

Among the roots of the 'Battle of Seattle' which broke out in November 1999 were the cultural events sponsored by Knight and his Reclaim the Streets friends in Liverpool on the opposite side of the world. Seattle had been the port where, two years earlier, an alliance between dockers, musicians, environmentalists and others had combined forces in support of an internationalist cause. 'Save the Whales' and 'Save the Turtles' activists had long been working alongside 'Save Our Jobs' trade unionists. These developments in Seattle ensured that when the World Trade Organization decided to hold its 1999 Convention in the city, activists across the area were primed for unusually creative and imaginative resistance to the WTO's globalization project. Seattle and its surroundings had by this stage become effectively a powder keg.

During the build-up to the 2009 G-20 Summit in London, Knight was involved in a street theatre group known as The Government of the Dead. Statements he made at this time in an interview for the London Evening Standard (and the PM programme) led the Corporate Management Team at the University of East London to charge him with 'advocating violence' and 'bringing the university into disrepute'. He was suspended and, despite a petition signed by over 700 academics and others, 'summarily dismissed' on 22 July 2009.

On 28 April 2011, Knight was one of three people arrested "on suspicion of conspiracy to cause public nuisance and breach of the peace". The three were planning a mock execution of the Duke of York (Prince Andrew) in Central London the following day, to coincide with the wedding of Prince William and Catherine Middleton. All three were later released without charge.

On 30 November 2011, Knight was one of 21 'Occupy London' activists arrested and later charged with public order offences for occupying the Haymarket (Central London) offices of the mining company Xstrata in a protest against the company's diversion of the McArthur River in the Northern Territory of Australia, violating sites held sacred by the Yanyuwa, Mara, Garrawa and Gurdanji Traditional Owners of the region. On 8 August 2012, following a hearing at Westminster Magistrates' Court, Knight and his co-defendants were all found not guilty.

In 2017, Knight supported Ken Livingstone in a controversy over allegedly anti-Semitic remarks made by the former London Mayor in 2016.

Family Background 

Knight was born in 1942 in Bury St Edmunds, Suffolk, where his mother Nora Dalton (born 1922, daughter of Philip Dalton and Nora Hennessy) had been serving in the Land Army. His father, Denis Knight, was born in 1921 in Volos, Greece, where Denis' own father, W. L. C. Knight, served as Consul General in Salonika. From 1 September 1941 to 10 January 1947, Denis served in the 44th Royal Tank Regiment as a tank co-driver. He stayed with the same crew in C Squadron throughout, first joining them in Egypt and Palestine in 1942. His first frontline action was in July 1943 as part of Operation Husky, the invasion of Sicily, with especially heavy fighting south of Catania at Primasole Bridge. He continued to be in the thick of it in late 1943 as the Eighth Army pressed up from the heel of Italy along the Adriatic coast. In early 1944 the 44th RTR returned to the UK to prepare for the invasion of Normandy, landing on Gold Beach on D-Day +2. Once again they were in the heart of the action around Caen and Falaise, then through northern France and into Holland where they were a vital part of Operation Market Garden, protecting the land corridor to Arnhem. Their final campaign was the invasion of Germany itself, crossing the Rhine at Xanten on 24 March 1945 – the first British tanks to do so. They continued to face stiff opposition from diehard Nazi troops as they took Bremen, and then on to Hamburg, when hostilities ceased on 5 May 1945. Denis and his tank crew were fortunate to survive – many of their comrades did not. In later life, Denis achieved recognition as a significant war-poet, while in 1986 he published an edited collection of essays by William Cobbett. Nora and Denis remained together for life and had five children (Christopher, Kevin, Elizabeth, Peter and Simon). When he was 30, Chris formed a long-term relationship with Ann Bliss. The couple have three children (Rosie, Olivia and Jude) and eight grandchildren.

References

External links

 (Science and Revolution)
The Laughing Professor

1942 births
Living people
Alumni of the University of Sussex
Academics of the University of East London
Alumni of the University of London
British anthropologists
British communists
British Marxists
British non-fiction writers
Human evolution theorists
Militant tendency supporters
British male writers
People associated with The Institute for Cultural Research
Male non-fiction writers